A boatsteerer was a position on a nineteenth-century whaleship. One of the most responsible members of the crew, his duty was to pull the forward oar of a whaleboat until reaching striking distance of a whale. He then would harpoon the whale with an iron while the boat-handler (mate) guided the boat.

See also
 History of Whaling

References

Marine occupations
Whaling